Kingsley Arter Taft (July 19, 1903March 28, 1970) was an American politician and distant relative of Ohio's more famous Taft family. He served as chief justice of the Ohio Supreme Court and also served briefly as a United States Senator. Kingsley's father, Frederick Lovett Taft, II was also a noted figure in the Ohio legal profession.

Biography
Taft was born in Cleveland, Ohio, to Frederick L. and Mary Alice ( Arter) Taft. He graduated from high school there and received a bachelor's degree from Amherst College, where he was a member of Phi Kappa Psi, in 1925. He received a law degree from Harvard University in 1928. Taft then practiced as a lawyer in Ohio. He rose to a partnership in the law firm that would eventually become Arter and Hadden.

Taft served in the Ohio House of Representatives from 1933 to 1934 and then in 1940, he was elected to the Shaker Heights, Ohio, board of education on which he served until 1942, the last year as president. He served in the U.S. Army during World War II, eventually rising to the rank of Major.

In 1946, when U.S. Senator Harold H. Burton (R-Ohio) resigned in order to accept an appointment to the U.S. Supreme Court, the vacancy was filled by a special election. In that election Taft ran and defeated Democrat Henry P. Webber. Taft served out Burton's term, which expired in 1947. He also served with distant family member Robert A. Taft during his 4-month tenure, and did not run for election to the next full term.

In 1948, he was elected to a judgeship on the Ohio Supreme Court, defeating Democrat Robert M. Sohngen. In 1954, he was re-elected to the position without opposition. In 1960, Taft defeated Joseph H. Ellison for a third term on the Supreme Court, but in 1962, Taft decided to run for Chief Justice of the Ohio Supreme Court. Taft then beat Democratic incumbent Carl V. Weygandt. Weygant, who was 74 years old and seeking a 6th term, lost by a margin of less than 1,600 votes, out of more than 2.6 million votes cast. In 1968, Taft was re-elected Chief Justice of the Court, defeating Democrat John C. Duffy, but died in office two years after his last election in 1970.

Personal life
Taft met his wife Louise Dakin at college. They were married September 14, 1927. They had four sons.

Taft was buried at Lake View Cemetery in Cleveland, Ohio.

References

Bibliography

External links 
 Encyclopedia of Baldwin Wallace University History: Kingsley Taft

1903 births
1970 deaths
Republican Party members of the Ohio House of Representatives
United States Army officers
Taft family
Harvard Law School alumni
Amherst College alumni
American people of English descent
Politicians from Cleveland
Chief Justices of the Ohio Supreme Court
Republican Party United States senators from Ohio
Politicians from Shaker Heights, Ohio
Burials at Lake View Cemetery, Cleveland
United States Army personnel of World War II
20th-century American judges
20th-century American politicians